BMW India started operations in January 2007. Wide range of its activities include a manufacturing plant in Chennai, a parts warehouse in Mumbai, a training centre in Gurgaon NCR and development of a dealer organisation across major metropolitan centres of the country.

Chennai BMW plant 

BMW Group Plant Chennai started operations on 29 March 2007. BMW Group Plant Chennai locally produces 11 car models – BMW 3 Series, BMW 3 Series Gran Turismo, BMW 5 Series, BMW 6 Series Gran Turismo, BMW 7 Series, BMW 8 Series, BMW X1, BMW X3, BMW X4, BMW X5, BMW X7 and MINI Countryman.

Models  

BMW 3 Series (Sedan only) 
BMW 5 Series (Sedan only) 
BMW 6 Series latest model launched on April 8, 2021
BMW 7 Series 
BMW X1 
BMW X3 launched April 2018 
BMW X4 launched January 2019
BMW X5 launched May 2019 
BMW X6 
BMW Z4 launched April 2019 
BMW X7 launched July 2019
BMW iX launched December 2021
BMW i4 launched May 2022

Sales performance

Number of units sold by year

MINI India 

MINI has successfully established itself as a premium small car brand in India since its launch in January 2012. Presently, the MINI model range in India includes MINI 3-door, MINI John Cooper Works Hatch, MINI 5-door, MINI Convertible, MINI Countryman and MINI Clubman. The MINI Countryman is locally produced at BMW Group Plant Chennai. Till date, MINI has established 10 sales outlets in India.
MINI Cooper
MINI Cooper Convertible
MINI Countryman 
MINI Clubman

Dealer/service network 

States and cities in India with one or more BMW dealership (number of dealerships):

See also 
Audi India
Porsche India
Mercedes-Benz India
Lexus India

References 

BMW
Companies based in Chennai
Vehicle manufacturing companies established in 2006
2006 establishments in Tamil Nadu
Car manufacturers of India
Indian subsidiaries of foreign companies
Indian companies established in 2006